Glen Echo, also known as Harpeth Hall, is a property in Franklin, Tennessee that was listed on the National Register of Historic Places in 1976.  It is a former plantation house that is now the centerpiece and administrative office of the Battle Ground Academy campus.

It was designed and/or built c. 1828 by Joseph Ruff. The structure includes Federal architecture.

It was one of about thirty surviving antebellum "significant brick and frame residences" built in Williamson County that were centers of slave plantations.  It is one of several of these located "on the rich farmland surrounding Franklin";  others were the Dr. Hezekiah Oden House, the Franklin Hardeman House and the Samuel Glass House, the Thomas Brown House, the Stokely Davis House, the Beverly Toon House and the Samuel S. Marten House.

References

Houses on the National Register of Historic Places in Tennessee
Houses in Franklin, Tennessee
Federal architecture in Tennessee
Houses completed in 1828
National Register of Historic Places in Williamson County, Tennessee